William Edward Harney (18 April 1895 – 31 December 1962), best known as Bill Harney, was an Australian writer. Most of his early life was an itinerant one of poverty and hardship, punctuated by tragedy, spent mainly in the outback.  He is notable for his writings about the Aboriginal peoples of Australia's Northern Territory.

Early life

Harney was born in Charters Towers, Queensland, the second of three children of English-born parents.  From the age of twelve he was working as a drover and boundary-rider in western Queensland. In 1915 he enlisted in the Australian Imperial Force and, following training in Egypt, served during the First World War on the Western Front in the 9th, later 25th Battalions.

Work in the Northern Territory

In 1921, after Harney won £260.00 on the Melbourne Cup, he leased Seven Emu Station in the Gulf of Carpentaria. He worked with the local Garrwa people to develop the cattle station. He was caught with two thousand cattle stolen from Cresswell Station and was incarcerated in the Borroloola jail. While awaiting his trial, Harney learned to appreciate the Classics, finding among the remnants of the town's Carnegie Library the works of Sue, Shakespeare and Plutarch.

After six months, Harney was released without conviction, and became a trepanger, fishing for sea cucumber. He worked closely with the local Yanyuwa people who traded trepang with the Macassans for 300 years prior.

From 1940 to 1947 Harney worked for the Australian government’s Native Affairs Branch as a Protector of Aborigines and as a patrol officer. Subsequently, he concentrated on writing as well as acting as an adviser on expeditions by the National Geographic Society to Arnhem Land and Melville Island. Between 1941 and 1957 he wrote numerous articles for Walkabout in which he was remembered as a colourful contributor. He was also an adviser during the making of the film Jedda (1955). 

He was appointed the first ranger of Ayer's Rock (now Uluru) in 1959, a job he held until he retired in 1962. Harney moved to Queensland and died the same year at his home in Mooloolaba. He is commemorated in the scientific name of the sandstone dibbler, Pseudantechinus bilarni, which reflects the Aboriginal pronunciation of his name.

Personal life

Harney married Kathleen Linda Beattie in 1927 and had two children. His wife died in 1932 from tuberculosis. His daughter Beattie died from the same disease in 1934. His son Billy drowned in 1945. Harney then began a relationship with a Wardaman woman Ludi Libuluyma. They had a son in c. 1934, the well-known Wardaman elder Bill Yidumduma Harney.

Bibliography
As well as many articles in popular magazines, books written or co-written by Harney include:
 1943 – Taboo
 1946 - North of 23
 1947 - Brimming Billabongs
 1949 – Songs of the Songmen (with A. P. Elkin)
 1957 – Life Among the Aborigines 
 1958 – Content to Lie in the Sun
 1960 – Bill Harney's Cook Book (with Patricia Thompson)
 1961 – Grief, Gaiety and Aborigines
 1963 - To Ayers Rock and Beyond
 1963 – The Shady Tree (completed by Douglas Lockwood)
 1983 – Bill Harney's War. Currey O'Neil: Melbourne. 
 1990 – A Bushman's Life (edited by Douglas and Ruth Lockwood). Viking O'Neil:

See also
 Australian outback literature of the 20th century

References

1895 births
1962 deaths
Australian non-fiction writers
Australian people of English descent
Australian stockmen